Each year, Nevisians celebrate their heritage during Culturama. It is Nevis' answer to the diverse range of carnivals enjoyed on other Caribbean islands. Held annually in late July/early August, it celebrates Nevisians who have moved away and returned to party with their friends and family. It is a commemoration and festival enjoying the cultural traditions. There's music every night, parties, food festivals, and concerts, culminating in the early march through downtown Charlestown.

The festival started in 1974. The idea of Culturama was conceived in February 1974 during a meeting of the Nevis Dramatic and Cultural Society (NEDACS).

References 

http://www.nevispages.com/culturama/about-culturama/

External links

Food and drink festivals in Saint Kitts and Nevis
Recurring events established in 1974
Music festivals in Saint Kitts and Nevis
Cultural festivals in Saint Kitts and Nevis
Carnivals in Saint Kitts and Nevis
Arts festivals in Saint Kitts and Nevis
1974 establishments in Saint Kitts and Nevis
Folk festivals in Saint Kitts and Nevis